Selenophanes cassiope, the cassiope owlet, is a butterfly of the family Nymphalidae. It was described by Pieter Cramer in 1775. It is found from Colombia through the Guianas to south-eastern Brazil.

Subspecies
Selenophanes cassiope cassiope (Surinam, Guyana)
Selenophanes cassiope amplior Stichel, 1902 (Colombia)
Selenophanes cassiope andromeda Stichel, 1901 (Bolivia)
Selenophanes cassiope cassiopeia (Staudinger, [1886]) (Peru, Brazil: Amazonas)
Selenophanes cassiope guarany Casagrande, 1992 (Brazil: São Paulo)
Selenophanes cassiope haraposa Bristow, 1982 (Brazil: Pará)
Selenophanes cassiope mapiriensis Bristow, 1982 (Bolivia)
Selenophanes cassiope perenensis Bristow, 1982 (Peru)
Selenophanes cassiope placentia (Fruhstorfer, 1912) (Bolivia)
Selenophanes cassiope theognis Fruhstorfer, 1910 (Brazil: Mato Grosso)

References

 Selenophanes cassiope at Insecta.pro

Butterflies described in 1775
Morphinae
Fauna of Brazil
Nymphalidae of South America
Taxa named by Pieter Cramer